Kevin Tucker (born 1975) is an Irish hurler who played as a right corner-forward for the Tipperary senior team.

Tucker joined the team during the 1996 championship and was a regular member of the team for just three seasons. An All-Ireland medalist in the under-21 grade, he did not win honours at senior level.

At club level Tucker is a one-time county club championship medalist with the Nenagh Éire Óg club.

References

1975 births
Living people
Nenagh Éire Óg hurlers
Tipperary inter-county hurlers